Sadat Mahalleh (also Romanized as Sādāt Maḩalleh) is a village in Divshal Rural District, in the Central District of Langarud County, Gilan Province, Iran. At the 2006 census, its population was 216, in 68 families.

References 

Populated places in Langarud County